Old Cardinham Castle is a hamlet in Cornwall, England, UK. It is in the parish of Cardinham very close to the site of the Norman Cardinham Castle, caput of the feudal barony of Cardinham.

References

Hamlets in Cornwall